A low Earth orbit (LEO) is an orbit around Earth with a period of 128 minutes or less (making at least 11.25 orbits per day) and an eccentricity less than 0.25. Most of the artificial objects in outer space are in LEO, with an altitude never more than about one-third of the radius of Earth.

Objects in orbits that pass through this zone, even if they have an apogee further out or are sub-orbital, are carefully tracked since they present a collision risk to the many LEO satellites.

All crewed space stations to date have been within LEO. From 1968 to 1972, the Apollo program's lunar missions sent humans beyond LEO. Since the end of the Apollo program, no human spaceflights have been beyond LEO.

Defining characteristics 
A wide variety of sources define LEO in terms of altitude. The altitude of an object in an elliptic orbit can vary significantly along the orbit.

The LEO region is defined by some sources as a region in space that LEO orbits occupy. Some highly elliptical orbits may pass through the LEO region near their lowest altitude (or perigee) but are not in an LEO orbit because their highest altitude (or apogee) exceeds . Sub-orbital objects can also reach the LEO region but are not in an LEO orbit because they re-enter the atmosphere. The distinction between LEO orbits and the LEO region is especially important for analysis of possible collisions between objects which may not themselves be in LEO but could collide with satellites or debris in LEO orbits.

Orbital characteristics
However, this depends on the exact altitude of the orbit.

The pull of gravity in LEO is only slightly less than on the Earth's surface. This is because the distance to LEO from the Earth's surface is much less than the Earth's radius. However, an object in orbit is in a permanent free fall around Earth, because in orbit both, the gravitational force and the centrifugal force balance out each other. As a result, spacecraft in orbit continue to stay in orbit, and people inside or outside such craft continuously experience weightlessness.

Orbits of satellites that reach altitudes below  decay fast due to atmospheric drag. Objects in LEO orbit Earth between the denser part of the atmosphere and below the inner Van Allen radiation belt.

Equatorial low Earth orbits (ELEO) are a subset of LEO. These orbits, with low inclination to the Equator, allow rapid revisit times of low-latitude places on Earth and have the lowest delta-v requirement (i.e., fuel spent) of any orbit, provided they have the direct (not retrograde) orientation with respect to the Earth's rotation. Orbits with a very high inclination angle to the equator are usually called polar orbits or Sun-synchronous orbits.

Higher orbits include medium Earth orbit (MEO), sometimes called intermediate circular orbit (ICO), and further above, geostationary orbit (GEO). Orbits higher than low orbit can lead to early failure of electronic components due to intense radiation and charge accumulation.

In 2017, "very low Earth orbits" (VLEO) began to be seen in regulatory filings.

Use

A low Earth orbit requires the lowest amount of energy for satellite placement. It provides high bandwidth and low communication latency. Satellites and space stations in LEO are more accessible for crew and servicing.

Since it requires less energy to place a satellite into a LEO, and a satellite there needs less powerful amplifiers for successful transmission, LEO is used for many communication applications, such as the Iridium phone system. Some communication satellites use much higher geostationary orbits and move at the same angular velocity as the Earth as to appear stationary above one location on the planet.

Disadvantages 
Unlike geosynchronous satellite, satellites in LEO have a small field of view and so can observe and communicate with only a fraction of the Earth at a time. That means that a network (or "constellation") of satellites is required to provide continuous coverage. Satellites in lower regions of LEO also suffer from fast orbital decay and require either periodic re-boosting to maintain a stable orbit or launching replacement satellites when old ones re-enter.

Examples
 Earth observation satellites, also known as remote sensing satellites, including spy satellites and other Earth imaging satellites, use LEO as they are able to see the surface of the Earth more clearly by being closer to it. A majority of artificial satellites are placed in LEO. Envisat (2002–2012) is one example.

 In fiction
 In the film 2001: A Space Odyssey, Earth's transit station ("Space Station V") "orbited 300 km above Earth."

Former 
The mission lifetime was limited because of atmospheric drag.

Space debris
The LEO environment is becoming congested with space debris because of the frequency of object launches. This has caused growing concern in recent years, since collisions at orbital velocities can be dangerous or deadly. Collisions can produce additional space debris, creating a domino effect known as Kessler syndrome. The Orbital Debris Program, part of NASA, tracks over 25,000 objects larger than 10 cm in LEO, the estimated number between 1 and 10 cm in diameter is 500,000. The amount of particles bigger than 1 mm exceeds 100 million.

See also

 Comparison of orbital launch systems
 Geostationary orbit (GEO)
 Heavy lift launch vehicle 
 High Earth orbit (HEO)
 Highly elliptical orbit (HEO)
 List of orbits
 Medium Earth orbit (MEO)
 Medium-lift launch vehicle
 Specific orbital energy examples
 Suborbital spaceflight
 Ukrainian Optical Facilities for Near-Earth Space Surveillance Network
 Van Allen radiation belt

Notes

References

Earth orbits
Articles containing video clips